David Ferrer was the defending champion, but lost in the first round to Xavier Malisse.
Qualifier Nicolas Mahut won the first title of his career, beating Stanislas Wawrinka in the final, 6–3, 6–4.

Seeds

Draw

Finals

Top half

Bottom half

Qualifying

Seeds

Qualifiers

Lucky loser
  Steve Darcis

Draw

First qualifier

Second qualifier

Third qualifier

Fourth qualifier

References
 Main Draw
 Qualifying Draw

Topshelf Openandnbsp;- Singles
2013 Men's Singles